Research Triangle Park (RTP) is the largest research park in the United States, occupying  in North Carolina and hosting more than 300 companies and 65,000 workers.

The facility is named for its location relative to the three surrounding cities of Raleigh, Durham, and Chapel Hill, or more properly, for the three major research universities in them: North Carolina State University, Duke University and University of North Carolina at Chapel Hill respectively. The Research Triangle region of North Carolina received its name as an extension of the name of the park. Aside from the three anchor cities, the park is also bounded by the communities of Morrisville and Cary. Approximately one fourth of the Park's territory lies in Wake County, but the majority of its land is in Durham County.

Overview
Research Triangle Park is one of the most prominent high-tech research and development parks in the United States. It was created in 1959 by state and local governments, nearby universities, and local business interests. Karl Robbins bought the land where the park is now built.
The park is traversed by Interstate 40, the Durham Freeway, and NC 540.

The park is home to more than 300 companies that employ 55,000 workers and an additional 10,000 contractors.

The park hosts one of GlaxoSmithKline's largest R&D centers with approximately 5,000 employees. Cisco Systems' campus in the park, with approximately 5,000 employees, is the second highest concentration of its employees outside its Silicon Valley corporate headquarters. The National Institutes of Health has its National Institute of Environmental Health Sciences located in the park and the city of Durham.

Research Triangle Park is owned and managed by the Research Triangle Foundation, a private non-profit organization. In August 2017, Scott Levitan was named the organization's new President and CEO, making him the 9th leader since the foundation was established.

History 

Following World War II, North Carolina's economy could no longer depend upon their traditional industries of agriculture, textiles, and furniture; their market share was in decline with jobs disappearing. Academics at N.C. State and Duke University came up with the idea of creating the park so that the universities could do research together, leverage the area's strengths, and keep graduates in the state.

Established in 1959, Research Triangle Park was created to increase innovation in the area. It is central to Duke University, North Carolina State University, and the University of North Carolina at Chapel Hill. At first, the park struggled to recruit innovators, but in 1965, Research Triangle Park had its largest surge of growth thanks to heavy recruiting by the state's government and Archibald "Archie" Davis. In their article "The Growth of Research Triangle Park," Link and Scott posit that entrepreneurial culture and leadership contributed the most to its success as a cluster. Archie Davis promoted a culture of innovation and entrepreneurship by locating the park near universities, actively recruiting organizations (like the American Academy of Arts and Sciences), and used his vision to raise funding for the park.

Davis strongly believed that profits could not be the only driver for creating the park and that the betterment of the community should be the key goal. "The love of this state … was the motivation for the Research Triangle idea," he said. "Research Triangle is a manifestation of what North Carolina is all about." Research Triangle Park remains a nonprofit.

Local government
The park is an unincorporated area, and state law prohibits municipalities from annexing areas within the park. Some local government functions are served by the Durham-Wake Counties Research and Production Service District, a special tax district created in 1986 that is conterminous with the park, wherein the property tax rate is limited to 10 cents per $100 valuation. The park has special zoning as a Research Applications District in the Wake County portion, and a Scientific Research Park in the Durham County portion. As of October 2012, both zoning areas are in the process of being revised to allow higher density development. The zoning changes are coupled with legislative changes allowing for Urban Research Service Districts (URSD) within the Park, which can include a mix of retail and residential usages. These newly permitted URSDs could levy taxes at the same rate as a neighboring city.

Redevelopment
On October 1, 2015, former President and CEO of the Research Triangle Foundation, Bob Geolas, announced RTP's plans for a $50,000,000 redevelopment involving the formation of "Park Center." $20,000,000 will be allocated from Durham County, $10,000,000 from the Durham-Wake Counties Research and Production Service District, and $20,000,000 as a result of land purchases and site work provided by the Research Triangle Foundation of North Carolina.

The redevelopment plans also include exploring partnerships with regional transit groups. The hope of the Research Triangle Foundation is to broaden public transportation to and from the area.

In 2019, the Research Triangle Foundation announced a re-brand of the site to "Hub RTP." The 100-acre site broke ground in September 2020 and will include 125,000 SF of office over retail, 1200 residential apartments, 16 acres of green space, at least one hotel, and 1M SF of the first high rise office towers in RTP.

Subsidiaries of The Research Triangle Foundation 
The Research Triangle Foundation operates several subsidiaries within the park. These include: the Frontier RTP startup campus, Boxyard RTP, and Hub RTP. Frontier RTP first opened as a free coworking space in a single building in January 2015. Since its inception, the Foundation has expanded the Frontier RTP concept to three additional buildings, creating an affordable campus for growing tech, life science and nonprofit organizations; as of 2021, 100 of the Park's 300 companies are housed in the Frontier campus.

Boxyard RTP
In March 2019, RTF announced plans to construct Boxyard RTP, an 15,000-square-foot shipping container complex of retail, dining, and other amenities. The $9M project, which is set on 12 acres of the Frontier RTP campus, delayed its launch for a year because of the impacts of the pandemic and soft-launched in June 2021 with a few of the planned tenants opening for business in the days following. The complex held its grand opening on November 18, 2021, with several anchor tenants open for business. Tenants include restaurants, a brewery, a cocktail bar, a coffee shop, a beauty shop, a CBD vendor, and an escape room. The complex also features a dog park named the Barkyard RTP, pop-up yoga classes, live music, and both standalone and roof-mounted heaters in the outdoor pavilion.

Boxyard RTP is inspired by a similar development called The Boxyard Tulsa, located in downtown Tulsa's East Village district.

See also
Megasite

References

Bibliography
 
 
 McCorkle, Mac. "History and the 'New Economy' Narrative: The Case of Research Triangle Park and North Carolina's Economic Development." Journal of the Historical Society 12.4 (2012): 479-525. Argues the old industries in the state promoted the Park. online

External links
 Research Triangle Park Web site
 Research Triangle Regional Partnership
 North Carolina's Research Triangle Park: An Investment in the Future UNC-TV documentary commemorating RTP's 40th anniversary, produced by John Wilson and narrated by Carl Kasell of NPR News

1959 establishments in North Carolina
Business parks of the United States
Buildings and structures in Durham County, North Carolina
Economy of North Carolina
High-technology business districts in the United States
National Institutes of Health
Science parks in the United States
Research Triangle
Buildings and structures in Wake County, North Carolina